Ryan Crossroads (also known as Ryans Crossroads) is an unincorporated community  in Morgan County, Alabama, United States.  A post office operated under the name Ryan from 1898 to 1905.

References

Unincorporated communities in Morgan County, Alabama
Unincorporated communities in Alabama